Abdul-Haleem Ismail Al-Mutaafi was the Minister of Agriculture and Irrigation of Sudan in 2012.

References

Government ministers of Sudan
Agriculture ministers
Living people
Year of birth missing (living people)
Place of birth missing (living people)
21st-century Sudanese politicians